Athol is an unincorporated community in Lee County, Kentucky, United States.  It lies along Route 52 east of the city of Beattyville, the county seat of Lee County.  Its elevation is 761 feet (232 m).  It has a post office with the ZIP code 41307.

References

Unincorporated communities in Lee County, Kentucky
Unincorporated communities in Kentucky